King George Hub is a mixed-use development with retail, office and residential high-rises in Surrey, British Columbia, Canada, located at the northeast corner of King George Boulevard and Fraser Highway in the Surrey City Centre district. Developed by the PCI Group and designed by MCM Partnership, the project is located adjacent to the transit hub at King George station.

History
Phase A began construction in 2012 and was completed in early 2016,  houses the headquarters for Coast Capital Savings, a federal credit union. The second phase, which began construction in early 2018, consists of the Hub 9850 office building, and the Hub One and Two residential towers. Phase B was completed in 2021.

Phase C, which began construction in 2019, consists only of The Line residential building. Phase D, the final phase, began construction in 2021. It consists of the Plaza One and Two residential buildings and are both estimated to be completed in 2025.

Buildings

Hub One

Hub One is a residential building located at 13615 Fraser Highway.

Hub Two
Hub Two is a residential building located at 13655 Fraser Highway.

Hub 9850
Hub 9850 is an office building located at 9850 King George Boulevard. Westland Insurance has occupied the top seven floors of the building since 2022.

The Line

The Line is a residential building located at 13639 George Junction. All units in the building are rentals.

References

External links

 King George Hub
 PCI Group - King George Hub

Buildings and structures in Surrey, British Columbia
Modernist architecture in Canada
Buildings and structures under construction in Canada